Tjitske Nienke "Cisca" Wijmenga (born 16 February 1964) is a Dutch professor of Human Genetics at the University of Groningen and the University Medical Center Groningen. She has been Rector Magnificus of the University since September 2019.

Life
Wijmenga was born on 16 February 1964 in Drachten. She studied biology at the University of Groningen and obtained her PhD at Leiden University in 1993 with a thesis titled: "Facioscapulohumeral muscular dystrophy: from genetic mapping towards gene cloning". In 1999 she became a university lecturer of medical genetics at the University Medical Center Utrecht. In 2003 she became professor of human genetics at Utrecht University. In 2007 Wijmenga switched to the University of Groningen where she also became professor of human genetics. She was appointed as Rector Magnificus of the University per September 2019, becoming the first female to hold the position.

Wijmenga was appointed a member of the Royal Netherlands Academy of Arts and Sciences in 2012. In 2013 she became a member of the Academia Europaea. In 2015 she was one of four winners of the Dutch Spinoza Prize, the highest Dutch distinction for academics working in the Netherlands. The award comprises €2.5 million. She was awarded the prize mainly for her research into the genetic factors associated with coeliac disease. She has also shown that several autoimmune diseases share common genetic factors.

References

External links
 Profile at University of Groningen

1964 births
Living people
Dutch geneticists
Leiden University alumni
Members of Academia Europaea
Members of the Royal Netherlands Academy of Arts and Sciences
People from Drachten
Rectors of universities in the Netherlands
Spinoza Prize winners
Academic staff of the University of Groningen
Academic staff of Utrecht University